Caramanta is a town and municipality in the Colombian department of Antioquia. Part of the subregion of Southwestern Antioquia.

Climate
Caramanta has a subtropical highland climate (Cfb). It has heavy rainfall year round.

References

Municipalities of Antioquia Department